Phi Beta Chi is a national sorority in the United States  Phi Beta Chi was founded in 1978 on Christian values and celebrates its Lutheran heritage.

History 
At inception, it was formed as a collegiate Christian sorority to support collegiate women socially, spiritually, and academically. Founders were from the Lutheran Church heritage.

Chapters and Colonies 
Approximately 25 chapters have been formed, of which five are active. Active chapters noted in bold, inactive chapters in italics.

See also 
 
 Christian sorority (fraternities and sororities)

References

Student organizations established in 1978
Fraternities and sororities in the United States
1978 establishments in Illinois